The 2019 Tevlin Women's Challenger was a professional tennis tournament played on indoor hard courts. It was the fifteenth edition of the tournament which was part of the 2019 ITF Women's World Tennis Tour. It took place in Toronto, Canada between 28 October and 3 November 2019.

Singles main-draw entrants

Seeds

 1 Rankings are as of 21 October 2019.

Other entrants
The following players received wildcards into the singles main draw:
  Françoise Abanda
  Ariana Arseneault
  Jada Bui
  Mélodie Collard

The following players received entry from the qualifying draw:
  Michaela Bayerlová
  Naomi Broady
  Hayley Carter
  Arianne Hartono
  Dalayna Hewitt
  Raphaëlle Lacasse
  Anna Morgina
  Kennedy Shaffer

Champions

Singles

 Francesca Di Lorenzo def.  Kirsten Flipkens, 7–6(7–3), 6–4

Doubles

 Robin Anderson /  Jessika Ponchet def.  Mélodie Collard /  Leylah Annie Fernandez, 7–6(9–7), 6–2

References

External links
 2019 Tevlin Women's Challenger at ITFtennis.com
 Official website

2019 ITF Women's World Tennis Tour
2019 in Canadian tennis
October 2019 sports events in Canada
November 2019 sports events in Canada
Tevlin Women's Challenger